The Mississippi class of  battleships comprised two ships which were authorized in the 1903 naval budget:  and ; these were named for the 20th and 43rd states, respectively.  These were the last pre-dreadnought battleships to be designed for the United States Navy, but not the last to be built, because one more ship of a prior design was completed later under the 1904 naval budget.  While the quality and technology of the weaponry and armor were first-rate, these ships included a variety of main, intermediate, secondary, and tertiary gun sizes in a predreadnought configuration which became obsolete before the ships were completed.

The first several years of the 20th century were a period of confusion and transition in US naval strategy, tactics, and ship design. The Mississippi class, along with the preceding , were designed based on lessons learned in the Spanish–American War, but while they were under construction, the Russo-Japanese War, war games, and experimentation demonstrated new priorities and concepts which would influence future designs.  This was also a period where rapid development of techniques and training in the use of large guns made the inclusion of rapid-fire intermediate and secondary weapons unnecessary. Future US designs would reduce the confusing array of guns sizes in predreadnought battleships and rely on one gun size for the main armament, the "all-big-gun" concept, along with many small guns of a uniform caliber to combat small vessels in close proximity.

The Mississippi-class ships were smaller than the several preceding classes of US battleships.  They were designed in an attempt to reduce the rapid growth in the size and cost of U.S. battleships. Also, a theory existed among influential naval leaders, including Dewey and Mahan, that many small battleships could be strategically useful, as were small ships of the line in the 18th and 19th centuries. In essence, the Mississippi-class ships were smaller versions of the preceding Connecticut class with virtually the same armament and armor, but the reduction in length, engine size, and fuel capacity caused them to be slow and short-ranged. Other design compromises caused them to perform poorly in terms of steering, stability, and sea keeping.

These ships served in the US Navy from 1908 to 1914, when they were sold to Greece.  Most US service was with the Atlantic Fleet, though these ships did not perform well in fleet operations due to their lower speeds and shorter ranges. The ships were frequently detached for special tasks, including goodwill tours, and Mississippi was used for a time as a seaplane support vessel. Both ships took part in US military interventions in Mexico and the Caribbean, including landing Marines and supporting early air operations.

In 1914, both Mississippi-class ships were sold to Greece, being renamed Kilkis and Lemnos; this was the only sale of functional US battleships to a foreign government. From 1914 to the early 1930s, the ships were active in the Greek Navy, serving mostly in coastal defense and attack roles. In these missions and in the calmer waters of the Mediterranean, their limitations were less pronounced. They served in the Russian Civil War and the Greco-Turkish War. By the mid-1930s, they were relegated to reserve and auxiliary roles, and Lemnos (ex-Idaho) had her guns removed to bolster coastal fortifications. Both were sunk by German aircraft in 1941, and raised in the 1950s to be sold for scrap.

Purpose

In the early 20th century, the US Navy was growing rapidly. The Navy commissioned its first battleships in 1895, and by the middle of the next decade, Jane's Fighting Ships ranked its battle line second only to the British Navy. However, this rapid growth was not universally supported either within the government or within the Navy. Compromises between powerful groups were frequently necessary to get funding.

The Mississippi-class ships were designed to meet Congressional and Navy Department objectives of reducing the escalating cost of new battleships, the quantity, size, and cost of which had increased dramatically over the first two decades of US battleship production.
  
A division occurred among US naval planners in the early years of the 20th century over whether to have technically superior ships or many less expensive ones, with President Theodore Roosevelt among those supporting the former and Admiral of the Navy George Dewey along with Captain Alfred Thayer Mahan supporting the latter approach.

The ships that became the Mississippi class were intended to serve as the modern equivalent of 19th-century third-rate ship of the line, offering what was thought to be an efficient compromise between sailing ability (speed, handling), fire power, and cost. This concept had formed the backbone of the sailing battle fleets of the previous century, but trends in early 20th century naval strategies were making the third-rate concept obsolete. Prevailing strategies called for a consistent battle line of first-rate units.

Design
The Mississippi-class battleships were the last predreadnought US battleship class to be designed; however, the last ship of the prior Connecticut-class design, was authorized and completed after these ships; therefore, it was the last US predreadnought ship to be built.

While Congress had authorized three vessels in the 13,000-long ton range, the design was not specified in the 1903 naval budget. Interesting adaptations were considered for new designs,

and weight-saving technology could allow increased efficiencies to be achieved from the older Maine class design,

which was closest to the weight goal.

As with most US naval designs, coal storage and engine efficiency were more important than in European designs. US ships might have to fight far from their home shores, especially in the Pacific. Even in the Caribbean, US forces might be farther from their coaling stations than a European power with colonial bases. Draft was a concern, since southern US harbors tended to have shallow entrances, and some proponents felt that all ships should be able to egress all major harbors.  Beams were typically limited by the width of dry docks.

Armament

In 1903, differing concepts of the ultimate combination of guns were available, with many ideas based on various experiences and interpretations from recent naval battles, war games, and other experimentation. Recent US battleship designs had included primary guns, intermediate guns, secondary guns, and tertiary guns, which were typical in the predreadnought configuration.
  
The quality of guns, armor, ordnance, and design was changing rapidly, so experience could quickly become irrelevant. Combat experience in the Spanish–American War had shown the value of many smaller guns at close range, where the larger guns had been inaccurate.
 
In the Russo Japanese War of 1904–1905, just six years later, decisive effects were obtained at long ranges, well beyond the effective limits of  ordnance. However, by this point the designs were established for the Mississippi class and the keels had already been laid down.

Main batteries
Recent American designs had continued to include large primary batteries of either  or  guns, along with several intermediate 8-inch guns for faster fire in closer combat with armored vessels. The lighter intermediate guns were considered valuable for penetrating upper-level armor, where the heavy guns were more effective on the main belt and heavy turrets. The former were likely to diminish the fighting ability of the opponent, while the latter were more likely to sink her.

Earlier US battleships had used 13-inch guns with black powder propellant; the 1898 design of the Maine class used more powerful but smaller 12-inch guns using smokeless powder, giving a greater velocity and flatter trajectory. These were considered an excellent compromise between weight and firepower, since limitations in gunnery control made longer-range guns impractical. The contemporary consideration was not whether to go larger, but whether to go with more. In 1902, naval officers, with the backing of President Theodore Roosevelt, began to develop superior fire control techniques and equipment. The development of better spotting and range finders led to improvements in range capacity and accuracy. At the same time, superior training and systems significantly reduced the time required to load and fire the large guns, from three minutes to one minute.

Intermediate 8-inch guns had been discontinued in 1896 with the Illinois class, but based on experience in the Spanish–American War in 1898, 8-inch/45-caliber guns were reinstated in the Virginia class and continued in the Connecticut class. Typically, these were carried in two-gun turrets, but the placement of the turrets had been inconsistent in prior designs; in two prior designs, the turrets for the 8-inch guns were superimposed over the turrets for the 12/13-inch guns (see  and  classes). Some designers felt that 8-inch guns were redundant to the faster firing 7-inch/45-caliber guns carried in casemates. Others argued that increases in the rate of fire and accuracy of the 12-inch guns eliminated the need for any smaller guns in the main battery.

Secondary batteries
In 1903, secondary batteries were typically considered to be a combination of torpedo defense—defense against smaller boats armed with torpedoes, such as torpedo boats or destroyers—and weapons to attack the lightly armored upper structures of capital ships.

The larger of these guns were typically protected in casemates and the smaller ones open on the deck or in lightly protected casemates.

A fast-firing 7-inch/45-caliber gun had been adopted with the previous battleship class to replace earlier 6-inch guns; these brought a significant improvement in ballistics, expanding the potential beyond torpedo defense, but came with drawbacks. Various opinions on the best combination of guns existed: all 8-inch, all 7-inch, or a mix.
  
Though considered to be quick-firing, the propellant for 7-inch guns was loaded in bags, making them slower than contemporary 6-inch guns. The Navy considered these to be excellent for the intended role; however, in World War I North Atlantic convoy duty, the disadvantages in seakeeping outweighed the utility; they were removed from battleships remaining in US service in 1918.

Beginning with the Maine-class vessels, commissioned in 1902, the  50-caliber gun (12-pounder) was used on most U.S. battleships as an antitorpedo-boat weapon. These and smaller weapons are frequently referred to as tertiary guns. This role was filled back to the earliest U.S. battleships, including the Texas and first Maine, by the 6-pounder . Most 3-in guns were removed from U.S. battleships before combat operations in World War I.

Competing designs
The future of battleship weaponry was at a crossroads. Opinions varied among top naval leaders; some U.S. naval leaders were discussing the all-big-gun concept in parallel with the British , while other designers felt that the torpedo would completely replace the gun, and battleships should become heavily armored launch platforms. Other proposals included even more but smaller primary guns, in the  size to save on weight. In 1903, analysis of war games had determined that one battleship with 12 11-inch or 12-inch guns, in a hexagonal turret placement, could be superior to three conventional battleships in individual actions.

Other analysis suggested that in fleet actions, only broadsides were effective, thus maximizing the number of centerline guns was the most efficient approach. While neither approach was incorporated in the Mississippi class, the centerline maximum broadside concept was followed in all subsequent U.S. battleship designs.

Final design
In the end, these ships were built with main batteries identical to the Connecticut class, while reducing by four guns the secondary 7-inch battery, omitting eight of the tertiary 3-inch guns, and sacrificing two torpedo tubes.  Subsequent designs would eliminate the 7-inch batteries completely, and most of the 3-inch guns were removed from other battleships before combat in World War I, so in this respect, the design did not suffer by comparing forward.

The main battery consisted of four 12-inch 45-caliber guns, meaning that the gun is 45 times as long as it is in diameter.  These were considered quick-firing guns and were arranged in two twin turrets, one forward and one to the rear of the main superstructure. The eight 8-inch 45-caliber guns were arranged in four twin turrets outboard of the main superstructure on each side of the ship.

The remaining eight 7-inch 45-caliber guns were distributed four per side, in casemates on the side of the ship, below the main deck.

  Four  50-caliber guns were mounted in the upper casemates (on the main deck), two per side, behind  of armor plate.  Another two, one per side, were mounted in blister casemates on the gun deck, near the bow. The remaining eight guns were on open mounts on the upper deck, the bridge, and other deck spaces.  Two submerged torpedo tubes were fitted on the broadside, near the bow of the ships.

Armor

Prior to the mid 1870s, armor was made of wrought iron plate, sometime backed with wood. In the 1870s, compound armor was developed, where a hardened steel face was cemented to a softer iron backing, which prevented cracking. During the late 1880s, nickel-steel armor was devised and in 1890, the Harvey process was developed, where a nickel-steel plate was treated with carbon and hardened in cold water. This process allowed one homogeneous steel plate to have both a hard surface and a softer back which was less likely to crack. During the 1890s, Krupp armor further refined the Harvey process by including additional metals in the alloy and developing a system where the hardening process penetrated more deeply into the plates.

The Mississippi-class ships used a combination of Harvey- and Krupp-style armor (American-made), with much of the side armor backed with teak wood, consistent with other U.S. capital ships of the decade. The amount of armor and its strength was consistent with the preceding Connecticut class and in some cases was more complete in coverage and was thicker, especially compared to the earliest ships in that series.

Machinery

When these ships were designed, the older technology of reciprocating steam engines was slowly being replaced by the newer technology of steam turbine propulsion. While turbines generally meant more speed, they were less fuel-efficient and limited the range of the ships unless more fuel could be stored. Early Dreadnought designs, which were in simultaneous development with the Mississippi class, used primitive direct-drive turbines. The U.S. Navy was slow to fully adopt turbines, and only used them exclusively in battleship production when indirect transmissions became refined (gear reduction or turbo-electric).

Mississippi and Idaho were equipped with two-shaft vertical triple-expansion steam engines, which drove two propellers. These were reciprocating engines where the steam was used multiple times (triple expansion) for greater efficiency. Steam was provided by eight Babcock & Wilcox boilers. In terms of speed, this class of ships was inferior to several preceding classes, and was only slightly superior to the Illinois class which was laid down in 1896.

The ships carried  of coal in purpose-designed coal bunkers and up to another  of coal could be stored in voids in the sides of the hull. The range was less than the previous class.

General characteristics

The final design was a scaled-down version of the preceding Connecticut class. By comparison, these ships were a knot slower and had a lower freeboard, so they did not perform as well in heavy seas. Each ship had a crew of 34 officers and 710 enlisted men.

The World Cruise of 1907–1909 tested the seakeeping of the U.S. designs. Even the earlier designs, including the Connecticut class with their higher freeboard, carried their secondary armament too close to the waterline.
The ships initially carried a pole mast above the conning tower, though shortly after commissioning, both ships had lattice masts added aft, and in 1910, the forward masts were also replaced with lattice masts.

The reduced length while retaining the same beam as the prior Connecticut class resulted in a disadvantageous length-to-beam ratio, causing reduced performance relative to that class. Not only was their top speed a knot slower, but also their economical speed was reduced by one and half knots. They also had 25% less coal storage, further reducing their operating range.

The Mississippi ships had poor seakeeping qualities, making them poor gunnery platforms underway in Atlantic waters. Their motion was irregular, and their low length-to-beam ratio caused excessive rolling and pitching, which made it difficult to keep the guns on target. The reduced length, significantly cut away from the aft, made it difficult to keep the ships on a consistent course, even in smoother waters.

Ships

USS Mississippi (BB-23)

The second Mississippi (Battleship No. 23) was laid down in 1904, launched in 1905, and commissioned in  early 1908, She was given a shakedown cruise off the coast of Cuba in 1908, then returned to Philadelphia for final fitting out.

In early 1909, she attended the inauguration of the President of Cuba, met the Great White Fleet upon its return, and was reviewed by the President. For the remainder of the year and into 1910, she traveled the waters off New England, the Caribbean, and the Gulf of Mexico, took a voyage up the Mississippi River, and participated in war games out of Guantanamo Bay.

In late 1910, she sailed to Europe as part of Atlantic Fleet maneuvers, following which she spent about 14 months off the Atlantic coast, based alternately in Philadelphia and Norfolk, serving as a training ship and conducting operational exercises. In June 1912, she landed a Marine detachment at El Cuero, Cuba, to protect American interests. Following exercises with the fleet, she returned to Philadelphia Navy Yard, where she was put in the First Reserve in August 1912.

In late 1913, she was assigned duty as an aeronautic station ship at Pensacola, Florida.  With the outbreak of fighting in Mexico in April 1914, Mississippi sailed to Veracruz, arriving with the first detachment of naval aviators to go into combat. In June 1914 she returned to Hampton Roads, where in July she was decommissioned and transferred to the Greek Navy.

USS Idaho (BB-24)

The second Idaho (Battleship No. 24) was laid down in 1904, launched in 1905, and commissioned in mid-1908. She was given shakedown cruise off the coast of Cuba in 1908, then returned to Philadelphia for final fitting out and repairs.

In the summer of 1908, she transported a detachment of marines to Colon in the Canal Zone to support a peaceful election process.  
In early 1909, she met the Great White Fleet upon its return to the U.S. and was reviewed by the President.  For the remainder of the year and into 1910, she alternated between the waters off New England and southern waters, including the Caribbean and the Gulf of Mexico, along with a voyage in the Mississippi River and war games out of Guantanamo Bay.

In late 1910, she sailed across the Atlantic with the Third Division of the Atlantic Fleet to Gravesend Bay, England, and then to Brest, France, returning to Guantanamo Bay in early 1911.

After routine service with the Atlantic Fleet and in Cuban waters, Idaho toured Gulf of Mexico and the Mississippi River in 1911, visiting many ports on the Mississippi River.

In February 1913, unrest in Mexico led to a coup d'état and the death of deposed President Francisco I. Madero. For the protection of American interests, Idaho deployed to Tampico in May and to Veracruz in June. Upon returning, she was placed in the Atlantic Reserve Fleet on 27 October 1913.

Idaho remained in reserve until recommissioned at Philadelphia in March 1914.  In mid-year, she steamed to the Mediterranean with a group of midshipmen on board.  After visiting several ports, she arrived at the French port of Villefranche on 17 July 1914.  There, she was formally transferred to the Greek Navy on 30 July 1914.

Greek service

Diplomatic tensions between Greece and the Ottoman Empire following the 1912–13 Balkan Wars resulted in each seeking to buy powerful warships abroad that would enable them to control the Aegean Sea.  Idaho and  Mississippi were sold on 8 July 1914, to Fred J. Gauntlett, an intermediary, who in turn sold them to the Greek government.  The proceeds of the sale were used to increase the budget for the 1915 fiscal year, funding the building of a third  super-dreadnought, .

Mississippi was renamed  for the crucial battle of the Second Balkan War, while Idaho became  in honor of a victorious naval battle over the Turkish Navy during the First Balkan War. Though their service was uneventful, these ships served to balance German capital ships which were acquired by rival Turkey. 

The design limitations and poor seakeeping tendencies were not as critical in that strategic environment and the calmer seas of the Mediterranean. U.S. Ambassador to Turkey Henry Morgenthau, Sr. wrote, "Those battleships immediately took their places as the most powerful vessels of the Greek Navy, and the enthusiasm of the Greeks in obtaining them was unbounded."

World War I
In 1916,  a serious division in the Greek government developed between King Constantine I and Prime Minister Eleftherios Venizelos over whether Greece should enter World War I. This became known as the "National Schism", where separate governments emerged.
 
Defections by units of the Greek Navy to the Venizelist factions provoked a Royalist purge of Venizelist officers and men from the Greek Navy. French Admiral Fournet, the Commander in Chief of the Allied Squadron, perceived the Greek fleet as a menace to the Entente powers in the Aegean. He delivered an ultimatum to the Greeks to sequester the small ships and disable the large ones. On 19 October 1916, the breech blocks, munitions, and torpedoes were removed from Lemnos and Kilkis. At the same time, the crews were reduced to one-third of normal size.

In June 1917, Greece was reunified under Venizelos and declared war against the Central Powers. Restoration of the Greek Navy was slow due to British and French disagreements and the difficulty in guaranteeing the officers and crews would support a war against the Central Powers.  When France returned the ships, Lemnos and Kilkis took part in Allied operations in the Aegean.  The greatest Allied need in the Mediterranean was for antisubmarine units, thus battleships were not a priority.

After World War I, both ships saw action in 1919 under the command of Rear Admiral G. Kakoulidis, RHN, when the Greek Navy took part in the Allied expedition in support of Denikin's White Armies in the Ukraine.

Later careers
The ships were also active in the operations of the Greco-Turkish War in Asia Minor from 1919 to 1922. As the Greeks had been on the winning side in World War I and the Ottoman Empire was one of the defeated powers, the Greeks were awarded large areas of mixed Turkish and Greek populations on the Asian coast of the Aegean Sea. On 15 May 1919, 20,000 Greek soldiers landed in Smyrna and took control of the city and its surroundings under cover of the Greek, French, and British navies. Lemnos was the flagship to the Second Fleet, based in Smyrna, under Rear Admiral G. Kalamidas; her mission was surveillance of the Black Sea, Dardanelles, and Asia Minor coasts. Over time, France and Italy became supportive of the emerging Turkish republic. Britain remained supportive of Greece, but opposed Greek moves against Istanbul in 1922. With waning support, the Greek army was defeated, and Greece was driven out of Asia by the Turks in late 1922, resulting in years of political and economic turmoil.

Both battleships were relegated to reserve and auxiliary roles in the mid-1930s. Kilkis, which had been upgraded in the mid-1920s, became a naval artillery training facility in 1932. Lemnos guns were removed and installed in a coastal defense battery on the island of Aegina. While they were both anchored in the Salamis Naval Base on 23 April 1941, both ships were sunk during the German invasion of Greece by Junkers Ju 87 Stuka dive bombers. Kilkis was hit by bombs and went down in shallow water at her moorings; Lemnos was also hit, but was able to get underway enough to be beached. The wrecks were refloated and sold for scrap in the 1950s.

Notes

References

Bibliography

 viewable online
 (viewable online)
 viewable online

 viewable online

 viewable online

 (viewable online)
(viewable online)
 (viewable online)

External links
 Naval Historical Center – Mississippi class battleships
 Naval Historical Center – USS Mississippi
 Naval Historical Center – USS Idaho 
 USS Mississippi – Navsource Battleship Photo Archive
 USS Idaho – Navsource Battleship Photo Archive

Battleship classes
Mississippi-class battleships